Çine Dam is a dam in Turkey. The development was backed by the Turkish State Hydraulic Works. It is the first major roller compacted concrete dam in Turkey. At its height of 137 m, Cine Dam is one of the highest dams in the world.

See also

List of dams and reservoirs in Turkey

References

DSI directory, State Hydraulic Works (Turkey), Retrieved December 16, 2009

Dams in Aydın Province
Hydroelectric power stations in Turkey
Dams completed in 2010